The National Electric Power Regulatory Authority (abbreviated as NEPRA) is responsible for regulating the electricity supply in Pakistan. It is also responsible for issuing licences for generation, transmission and distribution of electricity, establishing and enforcing standards to ensure quality and safety of operation and supply of electric power to consumers; approving investment and power acquisition programs of utility companies; and determining tariffs for the generation, transmission, and distribution of electric power. NEPRA was created when the Parliament of Pakistan passed the Regulation of Generation, Transmission and Distribution of Electric Power Act, 1997.

Composition 
NEPRA consists of a chairman appointed by the Federal Government and four members from each of the four provinces of Pakistan.

 Rehmatullah Baloch representing the Province of Baluchistan
 Engr. Maqsood Anwar Khan the Member representing the Province of Khyber Pakhtunkhuwa
 The position for the member representing the Province of Punjab is currently vacant
 Rafique Ahmad Shaikh representing the Province of Sindh

There is also a Vice-Chairman of the Authority, appointed from among the Members for a period of one year, by rotation.

See also 

 List of electric supply companies in Pakistan
 Electricity in Pakistan
 Water and Power Development Authority
 Economy of Pakistan
 Pakistan Electric Power Company
 Water and Power Development Authority
 Alternative Energy Development Board
 K-Electric

References

External links
 National Electric Power Regulatory Authority - official website

Regulatory authorities of Pakistan
Electric power in Pakistan
1997 establishments in Pakistan
Government agencies established in 1997
Electricity authorities